was a town located in Iwata District, Shizuoka Prefecture, Japan.

As of 2005, the town had an estimated population of 19,306 and a density of 678 persons per km2. The total area was 28.46 km2.

Asaba Town was created from Asaba Village in 1956.

On April 1, 2005, Asaba was merged into the expanded city of Fukuroi and thus no longer exists as an independent municipality.

Dissolved municipalities of Shizuoka Prefecture
Fukuroi, Shizuoka